Weethalle is a town in the Central West region of New South Wales, Australia. The name "Weethalle" is said to be an Australian aboriginal word for drink.

History
The area now known as Weethalle lies on the traditional lands of the Wiradjuri people.

The Weethalle area was set aside as homestead farms for returned soldiers in 1921. The Rankins Springs railway line was extended to Weethalle in 1922. Land clearing commenced and by 1923 the first wheat from the area was delivered to the Weethalle railway station.

By 1924, a site was surveyed for a village to service the surrounding farms with town allotment sales taking place the following year. A "skeleton" town was in existence by 1926, with "buildings in all states of construction" and "built mostly of wood". In the same year, a provisional school was established along with a branch of the Commercial Banking Company of Sydney.

An observer in 1928 described the growth of Weethalle as "remarkable" with the town having "sprung up in the night". In that year, a new hotel was built at a cost of £13,000. The hotel was the newest addition to a town that also boasted a bank, "2 stores ... butchers, bakers, hairdresser and tobacconist, several agents, a school, a doctor, a dance and picture hall, and a tri-weekly rail service."

Sport
The most popular sport in Weethalle is rugby league. The town's team, the Weethalle Kangaroos, used to compete in the Group 17 Rugby League competition. Nowadays, the town's players play for either West Wyalong or Rankins Springs.

Gallery

References

Further reading

External links

Weethalle - Bland Shire Council

Towns in New South Wales
1924 establishments in Australia
Populated places established in 1924